I Am is a collaborative tribute concept album to Meher Baba featuring Pete Townshend, Michael Da Costa and others, first released in 1972. The album includes the original version of "Baba O'Riley" played by Townshend alone without lyrics, which, at 9:48, is almost twice as long as the augmented version which opens Who's Next.

Other albums dedicated to Meher Baba and featuring Townshend include Happy Birthday, With Love, and Avatar (a compilation of the previous three albums, later released as Jai Baba).

Track listing

References

External links
 full album credits
 album credits (from bootleg CD reissue)
 Pete Townshend solo album index
 Meher Baba Tribute Albums by Pete Townshend

1972 albums
Pete Townshend compilation albums
Concept albums
Meher Baba tribute albums
Albums produced by Pete Townshend